Melvin "Buddy" Hayes (March 7, 1894 – death date unknown) was an American Negro league catcher in the 1910s and 1920s.

A native of Nashville, Tennessee, Hayes made his Negro leagues debut in 1916 with the St. Louis Giants and the Chicago American Giants. He went on to play for the Toledo Tigers and the Milwaukee Bears in 1923.

References

External links
 and Seamheads

1894 births
Year of death missing
Place of death missing
Chicago American Giants players
Milwaukee Bears players
St. Louis Giants players
Toledo Tigers players
Baseball catchers
Baseball players from Nashville, Tennessee